DWBL (1242 AM) is a radio station owned and operated by FBS Radio Network in the Philippines. The station's studio is located at Unit 908, Paragon Plaza, EDSA cor. Reliance Street, Mandaluyong, while its transmitter is located along Coloong 1 Rd., Brgy. Caloong, Valenzuela City (co-shared with sister station DWSS). It broadcasts daily from 4:30 AM to midnight.

History
DWBL was initially known as WBL during the Martial Law era. At that time, it was the top-rated radio station in Metro Manila airing a Top 40 format. Willy "Hillbilly Willy" Inong, Rudolph Rivera, Bernie Buenaseda, Orlando S. Mercado and Mike Enriquez were among the roster of the station. In mid-1985, when most of the jocks moved to DWKC-FM and formed WKC, Buenaseda remained on air, but left after a few months to set up DWTM "Magic 89.9". The following year, DWBL reformatted into a talk station, offering brokered programming.

In April 2015, 8TriMedia Broadcasting Network bought part of DWBL's time for its programs hosted by popular radio personalities, such as Dr. Rey Salinel, former Manila City mayor Alfredo Lim, Miguel Gil, Percy Lapid (who returned to the station in 2020 until his death after he was shot while driving home in Las Piñas, but later replaced by his younger brother Roy Mabasa), Shalala and Lloyd Umali. It lasted until October 2015, when it moved its airtime to DZRJ 810 AM, along with new programs.

References

DWBL
FBS Radio Network
News and talk radio stations in the Philippines